Allworth may refer to:

Allworth, New South Wales, small village in Australia
Allworth Press, publisher acquired by Skyhorse Publishing

People with the surname
Edward Allworth (1895–1966), American army officer
Edward A. Allworth (1920–2016), American historian
Robert Allworth (1943–2017), Australian composer

See also
Alworth (disambiguation)
Aldworth (disambiguation)